KTU may refer to:
Kerala Technological University, India
Korean Teachers & Education Workers' Union
Key Telephone Unit
KTU (band), Finnish-American
Keilschrift Texte aus Ugarit, reference for Ugarit cuneiform texts
KTU Gimnazija

Universities known by the initials KTU include:
Koforidua Technical University
Karadeniz Technical University (KTÜ), Turkey
Kaunas University of Technology (Kauno Technologijos Universitetas), Lithuania

See also
WKTU, a New York City radio station